Filip Florian (born May 16, 1968) is a Romanian writer and journalist.

Biography
Filip Florian studied Geology and Geophysics in Bucharest. Between 1990 and 1992, he worked as an editor for Cuvîntul magazine and later on, until 1999, as a correspondent for Radio Free Europe and Deutsche Welle. He currently lives in Bucharest.

Works
The novel Degete mici (Little Fingers) marked Florian's literary debut in 2005. It was awarded "best debut" by România Literară (Literary Romania), the excellence prize for debut of the National Union of the Romanian Patronate (Uniunea Națională a Patronatului Român) and the Romanian Writers' Union prize. The novel was translated and published in Hungary (Magvető), Germany (Suhrkamp), Poland (Czarne), Slovenia (Didakta), Italy (Fazi), Spain (Acantilado), Slovakia (Kalligram), Bulgaria (Ciela) and the United States (Houghton Mifflin Harcourt). Zilele Regelui (The Days of the King) published in 2008 was awarded the "Manuscriptum prize" by the National Museum of Romanian Literature; furthermore, the novel was named "book of the year" at the Contemporary Romanian Novel Symposium. The Days of the King was translated into Hungarian, Bulgarian, Polish and English; a Spanish edition is to be published by Acantilado.

Publications
 Degete mici (Little Fingers) - 2005, 2007
 Băiuțeii (The Baiut Alley Lads) - 2006
 Zilele regelui (The Days of the King) - 2008
 Toate bufnițele (All the Owls) - 2012

References

External links
The yellow notebook short story

1968 births
Living people
Romanian writers
Romanian journalists